Deric Wan Siu-lun (born 18 November 1964) is a Hong Kong actor, singer, and songwriter who has starred in numerous television series and released several studio albums. His representative works include a duet with Nadia Chan, a cover of the song Yat sang ho kau (一生何求), a villainous role in the film So Close and in TVB series such as Looking Back in Anger and The Breaking Point. Wan has worked for Hong Kong-based TVB (1986-1996, 2001-2005) and RTHK, Taiwan (1999-early 2000s) and CCTV. He currently works in China and at STTV.

Personal life 
Wan's first marriage was to Malaysian Chinese, Jacqueline Lee. They divorced after 4 years. His second marriage was to Winnie Poon who he began dating from 1996. The couple married in 2002 and divorced in the same year. He has also been romantically linked to Hong Kong actresses Sara Lee, Bessie Chan, and Sonija Kwok. He has been married to Chinese actress Zhao Ting since 2013. Together they have one daughter.

Since 1997, Wan has expressed his support of Hong Kong no longer being under British rule. He faced some controversy for his pro-China and rather 'anti-colonial' views as expressed on his Weibo account in 2013.

Filmography

Film and television
Radio Tycoon (1983)
City Japes (1986)
Friends and Enemies (1988)
Lemon Husband (1988)
The Legend of Master Chan (1988)
War of the Dragon (1989)
Looking Back in Anger (1989)
Triangular Entanglement (1990)
Blood of Good and Evil (1990)
The Cop Story (1990)
The Legend of Dragon Pearl (1990)
On the Edge  (1991)
One Step Beyond  (1991)
The Breaking Point (1991)
The Commandments (1992)
Vengeance (1992)
The Thief of Time (1992)
Royal Tramp (1992)
Royal Tramp II (1992)
All About Tin   (1993)
Heroes from Shaolin (1993)
Class of 93 (1993)
Legend of the Liquid Sword (1993)
The Wild Lover (1994)
Conscience (1994)
A Good Match From Heaven (1995)
Hope (1995)
Outburst (1996)
So Close (2001)
Double Crossing (2001)
Golden Faith (2002)
Good Against Evil (2002)
The Legend of Love (2002)
Twin Sisters (2003)
Heroes From The Dark (2003)
At Dolphin Bay (2003)
The Vigilante in the Mask (2004)
Grey Coloured Road (2004)
100% Senorita (2004)
Misleading Track (2005)
Wu Guo Jie Xing Dong (2006)
Li Wei Resigns from Office (2006)
Da Qi Ying Xiong Zhuan (2007)
Da Ming Yi Sheng Li Shi Zhen (2009)
The Mystery of Death (2015)
Dream Defender (2015)
The Duke of Royal Tramp (2019)
Once Upon a Time in China (2019)

Variety show
Call Me by Fire (season 2) (2022)

References

External links
 
JayneStars.com – English translated news about Deric Wan

1964 births
Living people
Cantopop singer-songwriters
Hong Kong male film actors
Hong Kong male singers
Hong Kong singer-songwriters
Hong Kong male television actors
New Talent Singing Awards contestants
TVB actors
20th-century Hong Kong male actors
21st-century Hong Kong male actors